Marc Warren (born 11 February 1992) is an Australian professional soccer player who last played as a left back for Perth Glory in the A-League.

He is a product of the Australian Institute of Sport Football Program having played for them in the 2009–10 A-League National Youth League. Born in Sutherland, Australia, Warren spent some time in the United Kingdom where he played for Sheffield United and Airdrie United, and has also represented his country at under 17 and under 20 level.

Club career

Early career
Warren grew up in the Sutherland area of Sydney, and played for local clubs Menai Hawks and Sutherland Sharks before being selected for the 2009–10 season squad with the Australian Institute of Sport Football Program. He was then signed by the Central Coast Mariners for the 2010–11 season. In July 2010, Warren and fellow Central Coast Mariners teammate Trent Sainsbury were chosen to spend two weeks at Sheffield United's Academy as part of the two clubs' partnership.

Sheffield United
In January 2011, Warren signed for Sheffield United on a two-year contract. Warren showed that he was a bright young talent and proved he was a versatile left sided player. training with the 1st team and Captain of the reserve team Warren showed leadership and determination. Warren also sat on the bench for the 1st team at a young age.

Airdrie United
Following his release from Sheffield United, Warren was linked with a move back to his first club Western Sydney Wanderers, joining them on trial in order to earn a contract. Warren failed to impress the club enough to earn a new deal, and the Wanderers declined to offer him a contract. Having failed to secure a move back to Australia, Warren returned to the United Kingdom, joining Scottish Division One side Airdrie United on a one-year contract. Warren left Airdrie to come back to Sydney fc.

Sydney FC
On 14 June 2013, Warren signed a one-year deal with A-League side Sydney FC, returning to Australia for the first time in a year. After the move, Warren described his return as a "great feeling", with Manager Frank Farina describing Warren as a "local boy". After a strong start to the season Warren picked up a red card, and was off the park for a few weeks. On his return picked up a groin injury that sat him out for the rest of the season.

APIA Leichhardt
On 17 April 2014, Warren signed a remainder of the NSW Premier League deal with APIA Leichhardt.

Perth Glory
Warren made a return to professional football, after accepting a 1-year contract from A-League club Perth Glory, following a 3-week trial. On 20 February 2018, Warren and Perth Glory mutually terminated his contract to allow him to explore other opportunities.

International career
Warren represented Australia at the 2007 International Youth Football Championship and played 3 times, scoring once against South Korea. Warren represented Australia with the Young Soccerooss at the FIFA U-20 World Cup in Columbia.

Personal life
With the club promoting their coaching in the community project, Warren revealed he taking up coaching sessions and said: "I’ve done bits and pieces of coaching back home in Australia. The club asked if I was interested in being part of this and I said yes. I really enjoyed coming in to teach the kids."

Career statistics

References

External links
 
 

1992 births
Living people
Soccer players from Sydney
Association football defenders
Australia youth international soccer players
Australia under-20 international soccer players
Australian Institute of Sport soccer players
Central Coast Mariners FC players
Sheffield United F.C. players
Airdrieonians F.C. players
Sydney FC players
APIA Leichhardt FC players
Scottish Football League players
National Premier Leagues players
New South Wales Institute of Sport alumni
People educated at Endeavour Sports High School
Australian soccer players